In July 2022, France played a two-test series against Japan as part of the 2022 mid-year rugby union tests. The first test was played at Toyota Stadium in Aichi on 2 July, followed by the second test at Japan National Stadium in Tokyo on 9 July. 

Coming into the series, France were ranked in second place in the World Rugby Rankings, while Japan sat eight places below in tenth. The two nations last faced each other in a test match during 2017 end-of-year rugby union internationals, which ended up in a 23-23 draw.

Fixtures

Squads

France
Among the starting 15 French players, 2 of them earned their first caps and 4 more had single-digit caps. French coach intended to give test experience to the fringe players.

Notes: 1 On 23 June 2022, Dorian Aldegheri withdrew from the squad following a thigh injury, while Aymeric Luc and Max Spring were on standby, being COVID-19 positive like assistant coaches Shaun Edwards and Laurent Labit. On 25 June 2022, Luc and Spring tested negative and joined the rest of the team in Japan.  

Head coach:  Fabien Galthié

Japan
On 31 May, a 34-man squad was named for Japan's 2-test series against Uruguay and their 2-test series against France.

On 7 June, Yutaka Nagare withdrew from the squad due to injury and Toshiya Takahashi was called up as his replacement.

On 17 June, Craig Millar withdrew from the squad due to injury and Shogo Miura was called up as his replacement. Also called up were, Takayasu Tsuji, Wimpie van der Walt and Tevita Tatafu.

On 27 June, Kaito Shigeno joined up with the squad ahead of Japan's 2-test series against France replacing Toshiya Takahashi and Amanaki Saumaki also withdrew due to injury.

Head Coach:  Jamie Joseph

Matches

First test

Notes:
 Thomas Jolmès, Yoan Tanga and Thomas Lavault (France) made their international debuts.
 France winning-streak of 9 consecutive test matches is their best series since 1937.

Second test

Notes:
 Max Spring (France) made his international debut.
 France equals his record winning streak of 10 consecutive international test matches.

Climatic conditions
The hot weather had been a major concern. At kick off of the first match, it recorded 34.5°C in Toyota. 24 hours before the first match, Toyota city recorded a historic high 39.8°C. As a result, three water breaks were put in place during each half of the match. Just after kick off of the second match, it recorded 31.5°C in Tokyo. Water breaks were also in place.

Condolences to Shinzo Abe
Before the second match, the 57,000 crowd observed a minute's silence for the assassination of Shinzo Abe. After the match, French captain Charles Ollivon offered a French jersey with the name "Abe Shinzo" printed. Abe was a keen supporter of Japanese rugby. He visited the Japan dressing room during the 2019 Rugby World Cup and invited the team to the prime minister's office.

See also
 2022 mid-year rugby union tests

References

France national rugby union team tours
Rugby union tours of Japan
France rugby union tour of Japan
France rugby union tour of Japan